Macedonia is an unincorporated community in Taylor Township, Harrison County, Indiana.

Geography

References

Unincorporated communities in Harrison County, Indiana
Unincorporated communities in Indiana
Louisville metropolitan area